Åge Ellingsen (born 5 November 1962 in Oslo, Norway) is a former Norwegian ice hockey defenceman.

Playing career
Ellingsen, nicknamed "the Moose", played nine seasons with Storhamar in Norway from 1983 to 1994. In 1987/88 he played for Björklöven in the Swedish Elite League (SEL), together with fellow Norwegian Erik Kristiansen. His native club was Forward of Oslo. He also played one season with Stjernen. His last club was Lillehammer.

Ellingsen also drew some interest from the Edmonton Oilers of the NHL and was drafted in the 8th round (168th overall) in 1987 but did not manage to get a contract.

He played 67 games for Norway's National team.

Today Åge is trainer for NTG-Lillehammer.

Post-retirement
Ellingsen is now a TV expert hockey commentator for NRK and SportN.

External links
 Storhamar Dragons alumni profile (in Norwegian)
 Norwegian born players drafted by NHL teams

1962 births
Edmonton Oilers draft picks
Furuset Ishockey players
Ice hockey players at the 1984 Winter Olympics
Ice hockey players at the 1988 Winter Olympics
IF Björklöven players
Lillehammer IK players
Living people
Norwegian expatriate ice hockey people
Norwegian ice hockey defencemen
Olympic ice hockey players of Norway
Ice hockey people from Oslo
Stjernen Hockey players
Storhamar Dragons players